Black Clover is a Japanese manga series written and illustrated by Yūki Tabata which has been translated into a number of languages and become a media franchise. It follows the adventures of fifteen-year-old orphan Asta, who, despite being born without the ability to use magic, has dreams of becoming the next Wizard King. In Japan, the series has been published by Shueisha in the shōnen manga anthology Weekly Shōnen Jump since February 16, 2015, and later collected in tankōbon format (collected volumes comprising 7 to 12 chapters) since June 4, 2015.

On February 9, 2015, Viz Media announced that they would publish the first three chapters of the series in their Weekly Shonen Jump digital magazine as part of their "Jump Start" program in North America.  On March 30, 2015, they announced that the series would join their weekly lineup, beginning with chapter 4 on April 6, and would be published at an accelerated rate until the chapters were current with Japan.  Plans to release the series in print were announced during their panel at New York Comic Con on October 9, 2015.


Volume list

Chapters that are currently not in tankōbon format
These chapters have yet to be published in a tankōbon volume. They were originally serialized in Japanese in issues of Weekly Shōnen Jump and in English in issues of Weekly Shonen Jump from January 2023 to March 2023.

References

Black Clover